The 2014–15 Southampton F.C. season was the club's 16th season in the Premier League and their 38th in the top division of English football. It was also the club's first season with Dutch manager Ronald Koeman, who replaced Mauricio Pochettino on 16 June 2014. Southampton finished seventh in the Premier League, having won 18, drawn six and lost 14 matches. The club also made it to the fourth round of the FA Cup and the fifth round of the League Cup.

Following the end of the 2013–14 campaign, Southampton released six players. The club also made a number of sales, with striker Rickie Lambert, captain Adam Lallana, centre-back Dejan Lovren, left-back Luke Shaw, right-back Calum Chambers and striker Billy Sharp all leaving. Dani Osvaldo, Jordan Turnbull, Jos Hooiveld, Gastón Ramírez, Jake Sinclair, Jack Stephens, Artur Boruc and Will Britt were loaned out.

In the summer transfer window, the Saints made six full signings – winger Dušan Tadić from Twente, striker Graziano Pellè from Feyenoord, goalkeeper Fraser Forster from Celtic, striker Shane Long from Hull City, centre-back Florin Gardoș from Steaua București and attacking midfielder Sadio Mané from Red Bull Salzburg. The club also brought in Ryan Bertrand, Saphir Taïder and Toby Alderweireld on loans. Taïder left just three weeks after joining.

In January 2015 the club signed Bertrand on a full transfer, as well as bringing in midfielders Eljero Elia and Filip Đuričić on loan from Werder Bremen and Benfica, respectively. Midfielder Jack Cork left to join Swansea City, while loan deals were completed for Jos Hooiveld to Millwall, Dani Osvaldo to Boca Juniors and Lloyd Isgrove to Sheffield Wednesday. The loans of both Artur Boruc and Jack Stephens were extended until the end of the season.

Graziano Pellè finished the 2014–15 season as Southampton's top scorer with 16 goals in all competitions (including 12 in the league), while captain José Fonte was named the Fans' Player of the Season.

Pre-season
Southampton began their pre-season preparations with a 4–0 win over Dutch side EHC Hoensbroek on 15 July. Winger Sam McQueen opened the scoring early in the 12th minute, and Calum Chambers made it two just before half-time. Billy Sharp scored a penalty in the 62nd minute, followed by a fourth goal from second-half captain Steven Davis two minutes later.

Two days later they travelled to face Belgian club KSK Hasselt, winning the game 6–0. New signing Graziano Pellè opened the scoring on his debut for the club with a brace in the 5th and 32nd minutes. Sam McQueen scored 14 minutes after the break and Hasselt defender Tom Weerts scored an own goal in the 67th minute. On 78 minutes Emmanuel Mayuka scored a penalty following a handball, and Sam Gallagher finished off the scoring late on.

Back in England, the Saints returned to action on 21 July, travelling to face League One side Swindon Town. The Premier League club largely dominated the match, although only won by a single goal courtesy of defender Jos Hooiveld's second-half conversion. Four days later, the Saints faced local Football League Championship club Bournemouth, again winning 1–0, with Lloyd Isgrove heading in the only goal of the game in the first half.

Southampton faced Brighton & Hove Albion on 31 July, winning against the Championship side 3–1. New signing Dušan Tadić opened the scoring with his first goal for the club, and Steven Davis made it two just before half-time. James Ward-Prowse completed Southampton's scoring in the second half with a long range effort, while Kazenga LuaLua pulled one back late on for Brighton. The Saints hosted their final pre-season friendly against German side Bayer 04 Leverkusen on 9 August, losing the game 1–0 to a  Graziano Pellè own goal despite a number of goalscoring chances, especially in the first half.

Premier League

August–October 2014
Southampton began the 2014–15 Premier League campaign against Liverpool on 17 August 2014, losing 2–1. The home side opened the scoring through midfielder Raheem Sterling in the 23rd minute. Southampton equalised ten minutes after half-time through Nathaniel Clyne, but Liverpool striker Daniel Sturridge later put Liverpool back in front. The Saints returned to St Mary's Stadium for their first home game of the season on 23 August, drawing 0–0 with West Bromwich Albion. The following week the team picked up their first win of the season at West Ham United. The Hammers opened the scoring through Mark Noble, but just before half-time Morgan Schneiderlin scored his first goal of the season to equalise. Schneiderlin later struck again to give the Saints the lead, before Graziano Pellè scored to secure the victory.

Following a two-week international break, Southampton beat Newcastle United 4–0 at home. The Saints opened the scoring after just six minutes through a Pellè header, before the Italian striker doubled the lead in the 18th minute. Jack Cork and Morgan Schneiderlin scored in the second half to see the team move to fourth in the table. The club picked up their third consecutive league win the following week against Swansea City, with the only goal of the game coming from Victor Wanyama just ten minutes before the end of the match. On 27 September, the Saints hosted Queens Park Rangers, narrowly winning 2–1 to extend their winning run to six games. After a goalless first half, Ryan Bertrand opened the scoring for the Saints before Charlie Austin equalised for QPR. However, Pellè quickly regained the lead with an overhead kick just minutes later.

On 5 October, Southampton travelled to White Hart Lane to face former manager Mauricio Pochettino's Tottenham Hotspur, to whom they suffered their second defeat of the season. Christian Eriksen scored the only goal of the game shortly before half-time. Two weeks later, Southampton hosted Sunderland and picked up their biggest win ever in the Premier League, thrashing the visitors 8–0 at St Mary's. In addition to three own goals, Graziano Pellè scored two and Jack Cork, Dušan Tadić and Victor Wanyama scored one each. In their next match, Southampton beat Stoke City 1–0 (courtesy of Sadio Mané's first goal) to move up to second place in the table.

November–December 2014
On 1 November, Southampton beat Hull City 1–0 to extend their winning run in all competitions to four games. Victor Wanyama scored the goal for the visitors after just two minutes from approximately 40 yards out after a misguided clearance.  The following week the club hosted Leicester City, winning the game 2–0 thanks to a pair of goals by second-half substitute Shane Long, his first goals at St Mary's for the club. Following another international break, Southampton's winning run came to an end with a draw at Aston Villa on 24 November. The following weekend Southampton hosted reigning champions Manchester City, against whom they suffered their first loss since 5 October. City dominated the majority of the game, winning 3–0 to take Southampton's place in second position with the Saints dropping to third.

Just three days later, Southampton travelled to the Emirates Stadium to face Arsenal. Despite their dominance, it took Arsenal until the final minute of normal time to score, when Chilean striker Alexis Sánchez converted the only goal of the game. On 8 December, Southampton hosted Manchester United and lost 2–1. United opened the scoring early on through Robin van Persie; the Saints fought back with an equaliser from Graziano Pellè, although van Persie struck again later on to secure the win. After three games against sides in the top third of the table, Southampton faced 19th-placed Burnley the following weekend. Despite this, the Saints slipped to their fourth consecutive defeat when they lost to a single goal.

Southampton finally returned to winning ways in their last fixture before Christmas against Everton, winning the game 3–0. Toffees striker Romelu Lukaku headed the ball into his own net, before Pellè and centre-back Maya Yoshida scored in the second half to ensure that the Saints remained fifth in the Premier League going into Christmas. On Boxing Day, Southampton beat Crystal Palace 3–1. Sadio Mané opened the scoring after 17 minutes, Ryan Bertrand scored a second shortly after the break and Toby Alderweireld scored his first of the season just five minutes later. Scott Dann scored Palace's consolation goal. Two days later, the Saints hosted leaders Chelsea and held them to a 1–1 draw. Mané scored for the second consecutive match to open the scoring for the Saints, before Eden Hazard scored just before the break to equalise for the visitors.

January–February 2015
Southampton started 2015 with a win, beating fifth-placed Arsenal 2–0 to remain fourth. The Saints opened the scoring after 34 minutes through Sadio Mané, before Dušan Tadić doubled the lead later on. Ten days later, the club beat Manchester United to move back up to third. Substitute Dušan Tadić scored shortly after his introduction in the second half to pick up the win. The following week, Southampton secured their unbeaten month of league fixtures when they beat Newcastle United to extend their unbeaten run to eight games. Eljero Elia scored his first goal for the club early on, however Newcastle equalised through Yoan Gouffran. Elia doubled his tally in the second half to give Southampton the win.

On 1 February Southampton suffered their first defeat since before Christmas when they lost 1–0 to Swansea City. Jonjo Shelvey scored the only goal of the game from the edge of the penalty area late in the second half to win the match for the Swans. The following week, the Saints narrowly beat manager-less Queens Park Rangers by a single late goal. After long periods of attacking play, Sadio Mané finally scored in the fourth minute of stoppage time at the end of the game. The club hosted West Ham United on 11 February, with the game ending as a goalless draw. On 22 February, Liverpool beat Southampton 2–0 with goals from Philippe Coutinho and Raheem Sterling, which was followed for the Saints by a 1–0 loss to 14th-placed West Bromwich Albion the following week due to an early Saido Berahino goal.

March–April 2015
After three league games without scoring, on 3 March Southampton beat Crystal Palace by a single goal. The goal came as a result of a James Ward-Prowse setup for Sadio Mané in the 83rd minute. Twelve days later, the Saints faced league leaders Chelsea, extending their unbeaten run to two games with a 1–1 draw. Diego Costa opened the scoring in the 11th minute, but the hosts didn't manage to keep the lead for long as Dušan Tadić scored a penalty just eight minutes later. On 21 March, Southampton beat Burnley 2–0. In the 37th minute Shane Long scored from close range, and in the second half Clarets captain Jason Shackell scored an own goal to double the scoreline.

On 4 April the Saints lost 1–0 away to Everton, the only goal of the game coming from defender Phil Jagielka. The club picked up a 2–0 win over Hull City the following week, with goals coming from James Ward-Prowse and Graziano Pellè (his first goal since December). Southampton began a poor run of form at Stoke City on 18 April, losing 2–1 to the fellow mid-table side. Morgan Schneiderlin opened the scoring for the visitors in the first half, but goals from Mame Biram Diouf and Charlie Adam in the second left Saints in sixth place. The following week, the Saints were held to a 2–2 draw by Tottenham Hotspur. Two goals from Graziano Pellè were cancelled out by Erik Lamela and Nacer Chadli.

Southampton continued their poor form with a 2–1 loss to Sunderland on 2 May. Sadio Mané equalised Jordi Gómez's 21st-minute penalty quickly, but a second penalty for the Sunderland midfielder gave the home side the win. The Saints lost again the following week at Leicester City, with two first-half goals from Riyad Mahrez keeping the visitors from moving further up the Premier League table. Southampton picked up their final win in the penultimate game of the season, beating struggling Aston Villa 6–1 at St Mary's. Sadio Mané opened the scoring with the fastest Premier League hat-trick in history in the first 16 minutes, before Shane Long (two) and Graziano Pellè completed the scoring. The club missed out on sixth place in the table on the final day of the season when they lost 2–0 to second-placed Manchester City, with goals coming from Frank Lampard and Sergio Agüero.

League table

Results summary

Results by matchday

Match results

FA Cup
Ipswich Town (4 and 14 January 2015)
In the third round of the 2014–15 FA Cup, Southampton were drawn against Championship side Ipswich Town. The lower league visitors opened the scoring within 20 minutes courtesy of a Darren Ambrose header, although within 15 minutes Morgan Schneiderlin equalised for the Saints. The replay took place ten days later, with Southampton winning 1–0 thanks to a Shane Long goal in the first half to progress to the fourth round.

Crystal Palace (24 January 2015)
Ten days after the third round replay, the Saints faced Crystal Palace in the fourth round, losing 3–2. All five goals were scored in the first half, with Graziano Pellè opening the scoring after nine minutes, only to be cancelled out by Marouane Chamakh's strike just two minutes later. A 16th-minute own goal from Scott Dann put Southampton back on top five minutes later, but within another five minutes Palace had equalised through Yaya Sanogo. Chamakh scored the winner six minutes before half-time.

League Cup
Millwall (26 August 2014)
Southampton entered the 2014–15 League Cup in the second round, first facing Championship side Millwall. The Saints won the game 2–0, with Jack Cork and Graziano Pellè scoring their respective first goals for the club to send Southampton through to the third round.

Arsenal (23 September 2014)
In the third round, Southampton faced fellow Premier League side Arsenal, winning 2–1 to advance to the fourth round. Alexis Sánchez opened the scoring for the hosts in the 14th minute with a free kick, before Dušan Tadić scored his first goal for the club from the penalty spot. Nathaniel Clyne scored the second with a strike from outside the area.

Stoke City (29 October 2014)
Southampton faced Stoke City in the fourth round, winning 3–2 to advance to the fifth round for the first time in ten years. Graziano Pellè opened the scoring early on to put the Saints ahead, before Shane Long scored his first goal for the club on 30 minutes to double their lead. Early in the second half, Steven Nzonzi pulled one back for the hosts, and Mame Biram Diouf equalised for the Potters in the last ten minutes. The visitors' top scorer Pellè struck again later to secure the win.

Sheffield United (16 December 2014)
In the fifth round, Southampton travelled to face Sheffield United, losing 1–0 to the League One side to be eliminated from the tournament. Scottish striker Marc McNulty scored the only goal of the game in the second half.

Squad statistics

Most appearances

Top goalscorers

Transfers

References

 

Southampton F.C. seasons
Southampton